Rosie Webster is a fictional character from the British ITV soap opera Coronation Street. She was played by Emma Collinge from 1990 to 1999 and Helen Flanagan from 2000 to 2012 and from 2017 to 2018. Flanagan has since said that she is unsure when she will return to the role.

Rosie is the first born daughter to Kevin Webster (Michael Le Vell) and Sally Webster (Sally Dynevor), older sister to Sophie Webster (Ashleigh Middleton, Emma Woodward, Brooke Vincent), and older half-sister to Jack Webster and deceased Jake Webster. Rosie's storylines have included a rivalry with younger sister Sophie, being kidnapped by John Stape (Graeme Hawley), and her modelling ambitions.

Storyline

Rosie's birth was part of the Coronation Street Christmas storyline in 1990. She was the first baby born to long-running couple Kevin and Sally Webster. The character's name is taken from the fictional street she was born on, Rosamund Street. Rosie had few storylines until the breakdown of her parents' marriage following her father Kevin's affair with Natalie Horrocks (Denise Welch). She then went through a bullying phase at school and was transferred to Oakhill Grammar School. Following the discovery of an affair between her mother and Ian Davenport (Philip Bretherton), Rosie distanced herself from her mother and tried to blackmail her over the affair. Rosie subsequently went through a goth phase and began a relationship with Craig Harris (Richard Fleeshman). Sally disapproved of the relationship, leading to conflict and a nearly fatal car crash. While the Websters eventually became reconciled to Craig and Rosie's relationship, it ended when Rosie refused to elope to Berlin with Craig.

Rosie began summer work as a PA at Underworld, the neighbourhood underwear factory, before beginning studies for her A-Levels at Weatherfield High where she began a secret affair with teacher John Stape (Graeme Hawley). After it ended badly, John kidnapped Rosie on two separate occasions. Later, Rosie sold her story to the local papers and posed for photographs. Following his arrest for kidnapping, John asked Rosie to visit him in prison, where he gave her £150,000 in compensation. Rosie bought a sports car and shares of Underworld but, her ex-boyfriend Luke Strong (Craig Kelly) conned her out of most of the money. In response, Rosie tried to blackmail John for £50,000 from him, saying that she would claim he had attacked her again. When John refused to pay her, Rosie carried out her threat, but ultimately failed and was forced to apologise and retract her statement to the police. Rosie then embarked on a career as a topless model, to the disapproval of her parents. She later received an opportunity to take part in a reality television series. Rosie broke off her relationship with live-in boyfriend Jason Grimshaw (Ryan Thomas) and left the show for London.

Five years later, Rosie returned to the street with Sophie. Rosie reveals to Sally that she is no longer modelling, and she and Sophie join their stepfather Tim Metcalfe's (Joe Duttine) window-cleaning business.

Development

Characterization
Between 1990 and 2005, Rosie was largely characterized as a typical child with unstyled tied up hair. In 2005, the character shifted to a goth style, dressing in black, wearing black make-up and dying her hair jet black. In 2008, Flanagan revealed to The Mirror that she disliked her character's goth attire, "I'm used to being a goth, seeing as I had to dress as one as Rosie for so long. It was all so unflattering – really unfeminine, long black skirts down to the floor and horrible jackets." Flanagan commented on her character's attitude at the time stating, "I hate all that Goth music such as Marilyn Manson and HIM that Rosie seems to like. Her favourite rock band are called Stench of Death -that says it all."

Rosie’s appearance was again changed around 2007 to reflect changes to the character’s behavior. Speaking about her character's new appearance Flanagan said: "I like to look sexy, but not tarty. Luckily, I do pretty well as Rosie – she's a glamorous girl, kind of a sassy secretary, so it's all pencil skirts, which I love, and a lot of low-cut tops. I don't want people looking at my boobs or want to be known for my boobs, but Corrie is a family show so thankfully they never go too far with it." When asked if her character is driven by money, Flanagan said, "I think she's attracted to the power and money. Rosie knows that she can use her womanly wiles to get what she wants. In the long run, she wants a life away from Weatherfield. She wants to be rich when she's older and aspires to be like Carla – gorgeous, sexy and wearing designer clothes," adding "It's not wholly about the money. She's more driven by glamour and power." She also commented that her character, "can be a bit of a bitch but she does have a heart."

Casting

Rosie was initially  played by child actress Emma Collinge. In January 2000, the press announced that Collinge would be departing the serial "to devote more time to gymnastics". "Budding actress" Helen Flanagan was recast in the role. Nine-year-old Flanagan, from Bolton, Greater Manchester, joined the soap on 23 January 2000. At the time, Flanagan told the media that she was "thrilled" with her casting. Flanagan discovered she had been chosen just a few days before Christmas Eve 1999, but was not permitted to reveal this to anyone for two weeks. In 2000, her mother Julia Flanagan commented, "She was really thrilled to get the part and she was bursting to tell people, but she just couldn't. The Coronation Street people had asked us not to tell anyone, so we had to keep quiet. The hardest bit for Helen was not telling her grandad because he's such a fan of the programme. When he did find out, he was absolutely thrilled. She is loving every minute. She's met most of the cast and is still very excited about it all."

In October 2011, it was announced that Flanagan had decided to leave Coronation Street. While some had speculated that she would quit the serial due to panic attacks on set, Flanagan said it was purely her own decision to leave because she had played Rosie for more than half of her life and decided to pursue other projects.

Flanagan said that she "disliked" playing Rosie. Speaking to the Sunday Mirror, Flanagan commented: "When I'm acting, I like things to feel real, and I didn't like Rosie's bitchiness. I didn't enjoy playing that kind of character. She went through a phase of being such a catty girl. As an actress you do the best job you can, but I didn't enjoy it because it didn't feel real. I always said to myself that I was going to leave when I turned 21. For me, the show represents my childhood, and I just couldn't have properly become an adult if I hadn't left." 

On 10 July 2016, while appearing on an episode of Loose Women, Flanagan expressed interest in reprising her role as Rosie, but admitted that she would prefer to only appear in a few episodes due to being busy as a mum. On 5 October 2016, it was announced that Flanagan would be reprising her role as Rosie for a short stint in early 2017. Flanagan commented: "I'm so excited to be returning to Coronation Street and being part of the Webster family again." Producer Kate Oates said: "The Websters have missed Rosie and so have we. With Sophie away on holiday with her sister, it seemed like the ideal time to bring Rosie back home with her for a visit. We are delighted that Helen is as keen to explore what Rosie has been up to away from the cobbles as we are." On 9 February 2017, it was announced that Flanagan had extended her contract to play Rosie for the foreseeable future.

In December 2017, during an interview with OK! magazine, Flanagan revealed that she was pregnant with her second child and would take maternity leave at the beginning of 2018. Flanagan left the show in April, indicating an interest in returning to the role at a future, unspecified date.

Reception

In 2005, the character's appearance caused real life controversy when Lancashire headteachers cautioned students against copying Rosie's style. One teacher was quoted saying, “If pupils are inspired to go gothic after watching Coronation Street then they will be breaching school rules.”

Jon Wise of The People commented on the character saying: "Her character has evolved from teenage Goth to saucy minx and superbitch." Flanagan was nominated in the category of "Villain of the Year" at the 2008 British Soap Awards, and "Sexiest Female" in 2011. In August 2017, Flanagan was longlisted for Funniest Female and Sexiest Female at the Inside Soap Awards. She did not progress to the viewer-voted shortlist.

See also
List of soap opera villains

References

External links

Just Rosie Official Website

Coronation Street characters
Female characters in television
Fictional models
Television characters introduced in 1990
Female villains
Fictional blackmailers